Oun Yao-ling (born 11 February 1940) is a Taiwanese weightlifter. He competed in the men's heavyweight event at the 1964 Summer Olympics.

References

1940 births
Living people
Taiwanese male weightlifters
Olympic weightlifters of Taiwan
Weightlifters at the 1964 Summer Olympics
Place of birth missing (living people)
20th-century Taiwanese people